Paraclimbing is competitive climbing for disabled athletes. 

The classification system defines who is eligible to compete in paraclimbing and groups athletes with a eligible impairments into sports classes. Athletes are placed into a sport class based on how much their impairment affects their ability to carry out the fundamental activities in paraclimbing.

Sports classification for competitions differentiates paraclimbing from adaptive climbing in general.

History 
The IFSC has been hosting paraclimbing competitions since the first international event in 2006 in Ekaterinburg, Russia. The sport grew, and a regular circuit was added to the IFSC calendar from 2010. IFSC Paraclimbing World Championships have taken place since 2011. The IFSC Paraclimbing World Championships run alongside the IFSC Climbing World Championships, promoting para athletes on the same stage as other athletes.

In January 2017, the International Paralympic Committee (IPC) granted the IFSC the status of “Recognised International Federation”.

Development 
In October 2018, the IFSC announced a plan for developing paralimbing. The IFSC Strategic Plan 2020-2028 includes plans to "professionalise paraclimbing to meet IPC standards and aim at its inclusion in future Paralympic Games editions, starting from Los Angeles 2028."

In 2023, three Paraclimbing World Cups (Innsbruck in Austria, Swiss venue Villars and an unspecified location in the United States) and the World Championships (Bern, Switzerland) are planned.

Competition formats 
In competition climbing, there are 3 climbing formats: Lead, Speed, Boulder. Lead is the dominant format.

In competitions, ranking is based on the furthest reached height while climbing. Competitors try unknown routes until they fall. If rankings are the same, previous round results or time is used to rank the athletes.

Participation and classification 
A wide range of different people take part in Paraclimbing, including visually impaired climbers, climbers with limb differences and those with brain injuries or mobility impairments.

To ensure a fair competition, athletes are classified in order to compete against those with a similar level of impairment. Under the IFSC classification system, there are 10 different sport classes:

 Blind Sport Classes (B1, B2, B3)
 Amputees (AU1, AU2, AL1, AL2)
 Limited reach, power or stability (RP1, RP2, RP3)

Higher numbers equate to higher functionality (less impairment), lower numbers equate to lower functionality (more impairment).

Before an official IFSC event (World Cup or World Championships), there is an evaluation session for those who require classification. During this evaluation session, classifiers test the Para-athlete in order to determine the correct sport class for them. Medical documentation is checked by the classifiers in advance.

References 

Sport climbing
Paralympic sports
Types of climbing